The Hantong Formation is a geological formation in Asia whose strata date back to the Late Jurassic. Dinosaur remains are among the fossils that have been recovered from the formation.

Vertebrate paleofauna

See also 

 List of dinosaur-bearing rock formations

References 

Geologic formations of China
Jurassic System of Asia
Jurassic China
Paleontology in China